The 1954 Bulgarian Cup was the 14th season of the Bulgarian Cup (in this period the tournament was named Cup of the Soviet Army). CSKA Sofia won the competition, beating Slavia Sofia 2–1 in the final at the Vasil Levski National Stadium in Sofia.

First round

|}

Second round

|}

Quarter-finals

|}

Semi-finals

|}

Final

Details

References

1954
1953–54 domestic association football cups
Cup